Anup Kumar Saha (born 23 January 1956) is an Indian politician and former Member of Parliament. He had been elected to 15th Lok Sabha lower house of Parliament of India in 2009 and he represented Bardhaman Purba, a parliamentary constituency in West Bengal state.

References

External links
 Detailed Profile of Dr. Anup Kumar Saha

1956 births
Living people
21st-century Bengalis
Bengali Hindus
India MPs 2009–2014
Communist Party of India (Marxist) politicians from West Bengal
Lok Sabha members from West Bengal
People from Paschim Medinipur district
People from Purba Bardhaman district
University of Burdwan alumni
University of Calcutta alumni